Wardell Stephen Curry II (born March 14, 1988) is an American professional basketball player for the Golden State Warriors of the National Basketball Association (NBA). Widely regarded as one of the greatest basketball players of all time, and as the greatest shooter in NBA history, Curry is credited with revolutionizing the sport by inspiring teams and players to take more three-point shots. A nine-time NBA All-Star and eight-time All-NBA selection, including four times on the first team, he has been named the NBA Most Valuable Player (MVP) twice, has won four NBA championships, and received an NBA Finals MVP Award and an NBA All-Star Game MVP Award.

Curry is the son of former NBA player Dell Curry and the older brother of current NBA player Seth Curry. He played college basketball for the Davidson Wildcats, where he set career scoring records for Davidson and the Southern Conference, was twice named conference player of the year, and set the single-season NCAA record during his sophomore year for most three-pointers made. Curry was selected by the Warriors with the seventh overall pick in the 2009 NBA draft.

In 2014–15, Curry won his first league MVP award and led the Warriors to their first championship since 1975. The following season, he became the first player to be elected MVP by a unanimous vote and lead the league in scoring while shooting above 50–40–90. That same year, the Warriors broke the record for the most wins in an NBA season en route to reaching the 2016 NBA Finals, which they lost to the Cleveland Cavaliers in seven games. Curry helped the Warriors return to the NBA Finals in 2017, 2018, and 2019, winning back-to-back titles in 2017 and 2018, but falling to the Toronto Raptors in 2019. After missing the playoffs in 2020 and 2021, Curry won a fourth championship with the Warriors against the Boston Celtics in 2022, and was named Finals MVP.

During the 2012–13 season, Curry set the NBA record for three-pointers made in a regular season, with 272. He surpassed that record in 2015 with 286, and again in 2016 with 402. On December 14, 2021, Curry set the NBA record for career three-pointers, passing Ray Allen. For their shooting abilities, Curry and teammate Klay Thompson have earned the nickname of the Splash Brothers; in 2013–14, they set the record for combined three-pointers made in an NBA season with 484, a record they broke the following season (525), and again in the 2015–16 season (678).

Early life
Curry is the son of Sonya and Dell Curry. He was born in Akron, Ohio at Summa Akron City Hospital, while his father was a member of the Cleveland Cavaliers. He grew up in Charlotte, North Carolina, where his father spent most of his NBA career with the Charlotte Hornets. Dell often took Curry and his younger brother Seth to his games, where they would shoot with the Hornets during warm-ups. The family briefly moved to Toronto, where Dell finished out his career as a member of the Raptors. During this time, Curry played for the Queensway Christian College boys' basketball team, leading them to an undefeated season. He was also a member of Toronto 5–0, a club team that plays across Ontario, pitting him against fellow future NBA players Cory Joseph and Kelly Olynyk. Curry led the team to a 33–4 record, en route to winning the provincial championship.

After Dell's retirement, the family moved back to Charlotte and Curry enrolled at Charlotte Christian School, where he was named all-conference and all-state, and led his team to three conference titles and three state playoff appearances. Because of his father's storied career at Virginia Tech, Curry wanted to play college basketball for the Hokies, but was only offered a walk-on spot due in part to his slender 160-pound frame. He ultimately chose to attend Davidson College, who had aggressively recruited him from the tenth grade.

College career

Freshman season
Before Curry even played in his first game for the Wildcats, head coach Bob McKillop praised him at a Davidson alumni event, saying: "Wait 'til you see Steph Curry. He is something special." In his first collegiate game, against Eastern Michigan, Curry finished with 15 points but committed 13 turnovers. In the next game, against Michigan, he scored 32 points, dished out four assists, and grabbed nine rebounds. Curry finished the season leading the Southern Conference in scoring with 21.5 points per game. He was second in the nation among freshmen in scoring, behind only Kevin Durant of Texas. Curry's scoring helped the Wildcats to a 29–5 overall record and a Southern Conference regular-season title. On March 2, 2007, in the Southern Conference tournament semi-finals against Furman, Curry made his 113th three-point field goal of the year, breaking Keydren Clark's NCAA freshman season record for three-pointers.

Curry eclipsed the school freshman scoring record with his 502nd point against Chattanooga on February 6, 2007. On March 15, 2007, Davidson marched into the NCAA tournament as a 13th seed set to play Maryland; despite Curry's game-high 30 points, Davidson lost 82–70. At the end of his freshman season, Curry was named Southern Conference Freshman of the Year, SoCon Tournament MVP, and selected to the SoCon All-tournament team, All-freshman team, and All-SoCon First Team. He was also an honorable mention in Sports Illustrated'''s All-Mid-Major. After the season ended, he was selected for the USA team to appear at the 2007 FIBA U19 World Championships in which he averaged 9.4 points, 3.8 rebounds, and 2.2 assists in 19.4 minutes, helping Team USA to a silver medal finish.

Sophomore season

In his sophomore season in 2007–08, Curry had grown to his adult height of 6 ft 3 in (1.91 m) and again led the Southern Conference in scoring, averaging 25.5 points per game while adding 4.7 rebounds per game and 2.8 assists per game. He led the Wildcats to a 26–6 regular-season record, and a 20–0 conference record. As a result of Curry's exceptional play, Davidson earned its third straight NCAA tournament bid.

On March 21, 2008, Davidson matched up with seventh-seeded Gonzaga. Gonzaga led by 11 points early in the second half but Curry went on to score 30 points in the half to push Davidson to their first NCAA Tournament win since 1969, 82–76. Curry ended the game with 40 points while also going 8-for-10 from three-point range. On March 23, Davidson played second-seeded Georgetown in the second round of the NCAA Tournament. Georgetown, ranked eighth nationally, entered the game as a heavy favorite after an appearance in the Final Four in 2007. Curry managed just five points in the first half of the game as Davidson trailed by as many as 17 points, but his 25 second-half points led Davidson to a 74–70 comeback victory.

On March 28, 2008, Curry led Davidson to another win, against third-seeded Wisconsin. Curry scored 33 points as Davidson won 73–56 to advance to the Elite 8. Curry joined Clyde Lovellette, Jerry Chambers, and Glenn Robinson as the only college players to score over 30 points in their first four career NCAA tournament games. Curry also tied Darrin Fitzgerald of Butler for the single-season record for most three-pointers with 158. On March 30, 2008, he set the record, against the top-seeded Kansas Jayhawks, with his 159th three-pointer of the season. Curry scored 25 points in the game but Davidson lost 59–57, and the Jayhawks went on to win the championship.

Curry finished the season averaging 25.9 points, 2.9 assists, and 2.1 steals per game. He was named to the Associated Press' All-America Second Team on March 31, 2008. He also was named the Most Outstanding Player of the Midwest Region of the 2008 NCAA tournament, becoming the first player from a team not making the Final Four to do so since Juwan Howard of Michigan in 1994. Curry was nominated for an ESPY in the Breakthrough Player of the Year category.

Junior season
After Davidson's loss against Kansas in the NCAA Regional Finals, Curry announced that he would return for his junior year. He stated that he wanted to develop as a point guard, his likely position in the NBA. On November 18, 2008, Curry scored a career-high 44 points in Davidson's 82–78 loss to Oklahoma. He extended a career-long streak by scoring at least 25 points for the seventh straight game. On November 21, Curry registered a career-high 13 assists, to go along with 30 points, in Davidson's 97–70 win over Winthrop. On November 25, against Loyola, Curry was held scoreless as Loyola constantly double-teamed him. It was Curry's only scoreless collegiate game and just his second without double-digit points. He finished 0-for-3 from the field as Davidson won the game 78–48. In Davidson's next game (11 days later), Curry matched his career high of 44 in a 72–67 win over North Carolina State.

Curry surpassed the 2000-point mark for his career on January 3, 2009, as he scored 21 points against Samford. On February 14, 2009, Curry rolled his ankle in the second half of a win over Furman. The injury caused Curry to miss the February 18 game against The Citadel, the first and only game he missed in his college career. On February 28, 2009, Curry became Davidson's all-time leading scorer with 34 points in a 99–56 win against Georgia Southern. That gave Curry 2,488 points for his career, surpassing previous school leader John Gerdy. Davidson won the 2008–09 Southern Conference regular season championship for the south division, finishing 18–2 in the conference.

In the 2009 Southern Conference tournament, Davidson played Appalachian State in the quarterfinals and won 84–68. Curry scored 43 points, which is the third most points in Southern Conference tournament history. In the semifinals, against the College of Charleston, Curry had 20 points but Davidson lost 52–59. Despite lobbying from Davidson head coach Bob McKillop and Charleston coach Bobby Cremins, the Wildcats failed to get an NCAA tournament bid. Instead, they received the sixth seed in the 2009 NIT. Davidson played the third seed, South Carolina, on the road in the first round. Curry scored 32 points as the Wildcats beat the Gamecocks 70–63. Davidson then lost 80–68 to the Saint Mary's Gaels in the second round. Curry registered 26 points, nine rebounds, and five assists in what was his final game for the Wildcats.

In his final season at Davidson, Curry averaged 28.6 points, 5.6 assists, and 2.5 steals. He was the NCAA scoring leader and was named a consensus first team All-American. Curry opted out of his senior year at Davidson, but he stated that he still planned to earn his degree. He completed his bachelor’s degree in sociology in May 2022. Curry's completion of his degree qualified him for jersey or number retirement; Davidson reserves that honor for players who complete their degrees at the school. In a ceremony held on August 31, 2022, Curry became the first Davidson player to have his number retired (six others have jerseys retired, but their numbers remain in circulation). At the ceremony, he also entered Davidson's athletic hall of fame and physically received his Davidson diploma.

Professional career

 Golden State Warriors (2009–present) 

Early years (2009–2012)

On June 25, 2009, Curry was selected as the seventh overall pick in the 2009 NBA draft by the Golden State Warriors. He appeared in 80 games (77 starts) during the 2009–10 season, averaging 17.5 points, 4.5 rebounds, 5.9 assists and 1.90 steals in 36.2 minutes. His second half of the season vaulted him into the rookie of the year race. He was named Western Conference Rookie of the Month for January, March and April, finishing as the only Western Conference rookie to win the award three times. He finished runner-up for the NBA Rookie of the Year Award behind Tyreke Evans and was a unanimous NBA All-Rookie First Team selection, becoming the first Warriors player since Jason Richardson in 2001–02 to earn All-Rookie First Team honors. He scored 30-plus points eight times, setting the most 30-point games by any rookie in 2009–10 and the most since LeBron James had 13 and Carmelo Anthony had 10 in 2003–04. Curry had five 30-point/10-assist games, which tied Michael Jordan for the second-most 30-point/10-assist games by a rookie (Oscar Robertson is first with 25). He became just the sixth rookie in NBA history to post a 35-point, 10-assist, 10-rebound game when he registered his first career triple-double with 36 points, 13 assists and 10 rebounds against the Los Angeles Clippers on February 10. In the Warriors' season finale against the Portland Trail Blazers on April 14, Curry recorded a then career-high 42 points, nine rebounds and eight assists, becoming the first rookie since Robertson in February 1961 to register at least those numbers in each category in the same game. Curry finished his rookie season with 166 three-pointers, which were the most ever by a rookie in NBA history.

In 2010–11, Curry appeared in 74 games (all starts), averaging 18.6 points, 3.9 rebounds, 5.8 assists and 1.47 steals in 33.6 minutes per contest. His free throw percentage of .934 (212–227 FT) established a new Warriors single-season record, surpassing the previous mark of .924 set by Rick Barry in 1977–78. He also became the first Warriors player to lead the NBA in free throw percentage since Mark Price in 1996–97. Curry registered 20-or-more points 35 times, including seven 30-plus performances. He posted a season-high 39 points and a then career-high 14 field goals (on 20 FGA) against the Oklahoma City Thunder on December 5. In February 2011, during All-Star Weekend, Curry won the Skills Challenge and registered 13 points, eight assists, and six rebounds in 28 minutes as a member of the Sophomore squad in the Rookie Challenge. In May 2011, he was named the recipient of the NBA Sportsmanship Award, and underwent surgery on his right ankle.

In the lockout-shortened 2011–12 season, Curry appeared in 26 games (23 starts), averaging 14.7 points, 3.4 rebounds, 5.3 assists, and 1.50 steals in 28.2 minutes per contest. He missed 40 games due to right ankle and foot injuries, including the last 28 games with a sprained right ankle and subsequent surgery on the ankle, which was performed on April 25.

First All-Star and playoff appearances (2012–2014)
Prior to the start of the 2012–13 season, Curry signed a four-year, $44 million contract extension with the Warriors. At the time, many basketball writers considered the move risky for Golden State because of Curry's injury history. Over the course of the year, Curry and backcourt teammate Klay Thompson gained a reputation for their perimeter scoring, earning them the nickname the "Splash Brothers". In 2012–13, Curry appeared in 78 games (all starts), averaging career highs of 22.9 points (seventh in NBA) and 6.9 assists to go with 4.0 rebounds and 1.62 steals in 38.2 minutes. He established a new NBA single-season three-point record with 272 three-pointers, eclipsing the previous mark set by Ray Allen (269 in 2005–06), doing so on 53 less attempts than Allen did with Seattle.

Curry earned Western Conference Player of the Month honors for the month of April, averaging 25.4 points, 8.1 assists, 3.9 rebounds, and 2.13 steals in eight games in the final month of the season to become the third Warrior to ever win the award, joining Chris Mullin (November 1990 and January 1989) and Bernard King (January 1981). He tallied two of the NBA's top six scoring games with 54 points on February 27 at New York and 47 on April 12 at Los Angeles, becoming the first Warrior to score 45-plus at New York and Los Angeles in the same season since Rick Barry in 1966, joining Barry, Guy Rodgers, and Wilt Chamberlain as the only four Warriors to do so. Curry's 54 points against the Knicks included a career-best and franchise-record 11 three-pointers, becoming the first player in NBA history to score 50-plus points while hitting 10-plus three-pointers in a game. It was the most scored by a Warrior since Purvis Short tallied 59 points in 1984. In 2013, he appeared in the playoffs for the first time in his career, with the Warriors earning the sixth seed in the Western Conference. In 12 playoff games (all starts), he averaged 23.4 points, 8.1 assists and 3.8 rebounds. He set a new franchise record with 42 playoff three-pointers, eclipsing the Warriors' career playoff mark of 29 previously held by Jason Richardson, giving him a total of 314 three-pointers for the season to become the first player in NBA history to hit at least 300 threes in a single season.

In 2013–14, Curry appeared in 78 games (all starts), averaging career highs of 24.0 points (seventh in the NBA) and 8.5 assists (fifth) to go with 4.3 rebounds and 1.63 steals, becoming the first player in Warriors history to average 24 points and eight assists in a single season (ninth player in NBA history). He led the league in three-pointers made for a second consecutive season with 261 (fourth-most ever in a single season), the first player since Ray Allen in 2001–02 and 2002–03 to lead the league in threes in back-to-back seasons. He was named Western Conference Player of the Month for April and earned All-NBA Second Team honors, becoming the first Warriors player named to the First or Second Team since 1993–94. On December 7 against the Memphis Grizzlies, Curry eclipsed Jason Richardson (700) as the franchise's leader in career three-pointers. In February, he made his first All-Star appearance, becoming the Warriors' first All-Star starter since Latrell Sprewell in 1995. He scored a season-high 47 points on April 13 against the Portland Trail Blazers for his third 40-point game of the year. He finished the regular season tied for second in the NBA in triple-doubles with four, the most by a Warrior in a single season since Chamberlain had five in 1963–64. Seeded sixth for the second consecutive postseason, the Warriors were defeated in seven games by the Los Angeles Clippers.

NBA championship and MVP (2014–2015)

Prior to the start of the 2014–15 season, the Warriors hired former NBA player and general manager Steve Kerr as their new head coach. Kerr implemented significant changes to Golden State's schemes, including playing at a faster pace and giving Curry more freedom to shoot, helping the team evolve into a title contender. On February 4, Curry scored a season-high 51 points in a win over the Dallas Mavericks. He was the leading vote-getter for the All-Star Game and won the Three-Point Contest on All-Star Saturday night. On April 9, he broke his own league record for three-pointers made in a season during a game against the Portland Trail Blazers. The Warriors finished the year with 67 wins and Curry was voted the NBA Most Valuable Player after posting averages of 23.8 points, 7.7 assists, and 2 steals per game. Over the course of the season, he sat out 17 fourth quarters due to Golden State's wide margins of victory.

In Game 5 of the Conference Semifinals against the Memphis Grizzlies, Curry became the first player in league history to register 6 three-pointers and six steals in a game. In Game 6, he made a playoff career-high 8 three-pointers en route to a series-clinching victory. In Game 3 of the Conference Finals against the Houston Rockets, he broke the NBA record for most three-pointers made in a single postseason. The Warriors went on to defeat the Rockets to earn a Finals matchup with the Cleveland Cavaliers, where Curry struggled to start the series, converting on only 22 percent of his field goals in Game 2. In Game 5, he scored 37 points, and in Game 6, Golden State closed out the series to win their first championship in 40 years. For the Finals, Curry averaged 26 points and 6.3 assists per game. The Warrior's playoff run was the first in which an All-NBA first team selection eliminated all other first team selections in on the way to a championship.

Unanimous MVP and historic season (2015–2016)

To start the 2015–16 season, Curry became the first player since Michael Jordan in 1989–90 to score 118 points in his team's first three games, including a season-high 53 points against the New Orleans Pelicans in the third game. The Warriors made NBA history on November 24 when they became the first team ever to start 16–0 with a win over the Los Angeles Lakers, before improving to 24–0 on December 11 with a double-overtime win over the Boston Celtics. Their streak was broken the following day against the Milwaukee Bucks. On December 28, Curry recorded his sixth career triple-double with 23 points, a career-high 14 rebounds and 10 assists in a 122–103 win over the Sacramento Kings. During the game, Curry was guarded by his brother Seth for the first time in their NBA careers. On January 22, he recorded his second triple-double of the season with 39 points, 12 assists, and 10 rebounds in a 122–110 win over the Indiana Pacers. He made 8 three-pointers in the game to reach 200 for the season, becoming the first player in NBA history to make 200 three-pointers in four straight seasons. On February 3, he made 11 three-pointers (including seven in the first quarter) and scored 51 points (including a career-high 36 points in the first half) to lead the Warriors past the Washington Wizards 134–121. His 51 points tied Gilbert Arenas and Michael Jordan for the Verizon Center record.

During the 2016 NBA All-Star Weekend, Curry competed in his third straight All-Star game for the West, and competed in the Three-Point Contest, where he lost in the final round to teammate Klay Thompson. At 48–4, the Warriors entered the All-Star break with the best record through 52 games in NBA history, one win better than the 1995–96 Chicago Bulls and 1966–67 Philadelphia 76ers.

On February 25, Curry made 10 three-pointers and scored 51 points to lead the Warriors past the Orlando Magic 130–114. Curry topped 50 points for the third time in 2015–16, the first player to do it that many times since LeBron James and Dwyane Wade did so in 2008–09. Curry also surpassed Kyle Korver's mark of 127 straight games with a three-pointer. With only one made free throw, Curry set a record for fewest free throws in a 50+ game. In the following game two days later, the Warriors defeated the Oklahoma City Thunder in overtime thanks to a Curry three-pointer with 0.6 seconds remaining; tying the NBA single-game record with Kobe Bryant and Donyell Marshall, Curry finished with 46 points as his winning shot was his 12th three-pointer. He also broke his own NBA record for threes in a season, leaving the new mark at 288. On March 7, in a win over the Magic, Curry scored 41 points and became the first player in NBA history to make 300 regular-season three-pointers. On April 1, Curry missed a three-pointer to tie the game against the Celtics with 5.3 seconds left, as the Warriors suffered their first home defeat since January 27, 2015, snapping an NBA-record 54-game winning streak in the regular season at Oracle Arena. On April 7, Curry scored 27 points to help the Warriors become the second team in NBA history to win 70 games in a season with a 112–101 win over the San Antonio Spurs. Three days later in a rematch against the Spurs, Stephen Curry scored 37 points in a 92–86 win, not only tying the 1996 Bulls, but snapping San Antonio's undefeated home streak and also ending a long losing streak in AT&T Center.

In the Warriors' regular-season finale on April 13 against the Memphis Grizzlies, Curry achieved another shooting milestone, becoming the first player to make 400 three-pointers in a season by knocking down 10 from long range on his way to 46 points and 402 total three-pointers. With a 125–104 win over the Grizzlies, the Warriors became the first 73-win team in NBA history, surpassing the 1995–96 Chicago Bulls' 72–10 record to finish the 2015–16 season with just nine losses. With the conclusion of the regular season, Curry became the seventh player in NBA history to join the 50–40–90 club, representing the shooting percentages from the field (.504), beyond the arc (.454), and the free-throw line (.908). The league's leading scorer at 30.1 points per game, he posted the highest scoring average of the first 29 50–40–90 seasons. Curry was named the league's first ever unanimous MVP, becoming the 11th player in NBA history to win the award in consecutive seasons and the first guard to do so since Steve Nash in 2004–05 and 2005–06. His scoring average increase of 6.3 is the largest ever by a reigning MVP.

In the 2016 playoffs, the Warriors defeated the Houston Rockets in the first round despite Curry only playing in the first half of Games 1 and 4 due to injury. A right MCL injury kept him out of the first three games of the second round. In Game 4 of the second-round series against the Portland Trail Blazers, Curry came off the bench to score 40 points in a 132–125 overtime win; 17 of those points came in the extra period, an NBA record for points scored by an individual in overtime. Curry led the Warriors to a 4–1 victory over the Trail Blazers, as they moved on to the Western Conference Finals to face the Oklahoma City Thunder. After going down 3–1, he helped the Warriors rally to win the series 4–3 and advance to their second straight NBA Finals.

In the Finals, Curry's play relative to his regular season performance remained inconsistent, as it had been since he returned from injury against Portland; still, he broke Danny Green's record of 27 three-pointers made in a Finals. Despite being up 3–1 in the series, the Warriors were defeated by the Cleveland Cavaliers in seven games and became the first team in NBA Finals history to lose a series after leading 3–1. In the game seven loss, Curry scored 17 points on 6-of-19 shooting.

Back-to-back championships (2016–2018)

On October 28, 2016, Curry hit four three-pointers against the New Orleans Pelicans to reach 1,600 for his career, becoming the 19th player to do so, as well as the fastest to reach the mark. On November 4, Curry's NBA-record streak of 157 straight games with at least one made three-pointer was snapped during the Warriors' 117–97 loss to the Los Angeles Lakers after he went 0-of-10 from three-point range. He had hit a three-pointer in every regular-season game since November 11, 2014. Three days later, he hit 13 three-pointers against New Orleans, setting an NBA record for most three-pointers made in a regular-season game. Curry shot 16-of-26 overall against the Pelicans for his first 40-point game of the season, finishing with 46 in a 116–106 win. On December 11, Curry hit 2 three-pointers against the Minnesota Timberwolves to pass Steve Nash for 17th on the NBA's career three-pointers list.

With 14 points against the Dallas Mavericks on December 30, Curry (11,903) passed Purvis Short (11,894) for seventh place on the Warriors' all-time scoring list. In a loss to the Memphis Grizzlies on January 6, 2017, Curry had his second 40-point game of the season and reached the 12,000-point threshold, becoming the seventh player in Warriors history to score 12,000 career points. On January 19, Curry was named a starter on the Western Conference All-Star team for the 2017 NBA All-Star Game. On February 2, he hit his 200th three-pointer of the season in the Warriors' 133–120 win over the Los Angeles Clippers, making him the first player in NBA history to have 200 or more three-pointers in five consecutive seasons. On March 5, he scored 31 points and moved into the top 10 on the NBA's career three-point list in a 112–105 win over the New York Knicks. Curry hit 5 three-pointers, passing Chauncey Billups for 10th place.

Curry helped the Warriors sweep through the first two rounds of the playoffs. In Game 1 of the Western Conference Finals against the San Antonio Spurs, Curry scored 40 points and hit a tying three-pointer with 1:48 remaining to help the Warriors rally from a 25-point deficit to win 113–111; the Warriors overcame their largest halftime deficit ever in the postseason at 20 points. This was the second time in the season that the Warriors came back from a 20-point deficit against the Spurs. In a 120–108 Game 3 win, Curry scored 21 points and became the franchise leader in postseason points, passing Rick Barry. They went up 3–0 in the series, becoming the third team in NBA history to win their first 11 playoff games. His 36 points in Game 4 led to a 129–115 victory that saw the Warriors advance to the NBA Finals for a third straight year while becoming the first team in league history to start the playoffs 12–0. In Game 2 of the 2017 NBA Finals against the Cleveland Cavaliers, Curry recorded his first career postseason triple-double with 32 points, 11 assists and 10 rebounds to help the Warriors go up 2–0 in the series with a 132–113 win. Curry helped the Warriors clinch the series and the championship in Game 5 with 34 points, 10 assists, and six rebounds, as Golden State claimed its second title in three years.

On July 1, 2017, Curry agreed to a five-year, $201 million extension with the Warriors, becoming the first NBA player to sign a supermax contract worth over $200 million. He officially signed the contract on July 25. On December 1, he scored 23 points and passed Jason Kidd for eighth place on the career three-pointers made list in a 133–112 win over the Orlando Magic. On December 4, in a 125–115 win over the New Orleans Pelicans, Curry hit 5 three-pointers to become the fastest NBA player to achieve the milestone of 2,000 career three-pointers, achieving that mark in just 597 games, 227 less than the previous fastest player to achieve that mark, Ray Allen. In that same game, Curry injured his right ankle and subsequently missed 11 games, returning to action on December 30 and scoring 38 points with a season-high 10 three-pointers in a 141–128 win over the Memphis Grizzlies. Curry shot 13 for 17 and 10 of 13 from deep in 26 minutes for his ninth 30-point game of the season. It also marked Curry's ninth career game with 10 or more 3s, the most by any player in NBA history.

On January 6, in a 121–105 win over the Los Angeles Clippers, Curry scored 45 points in three quarters. On January 25, he scored 25 points in a 126–113 win over the Minnesota Timberwolves. Curry became the fifth player in Warriors history to score 14,000 points, ending the game with 14,023 and joining Wilt Chamberlain (17,783), Rick Barry (16,447), Paul Arizin (16,266), and Chris Mullin (16,235) on the franchise list. On January 27, he scored 49 points—with 13 of those over the final 1:42—and hit 8 three-pointers, lifting the Warriors past the Boston Celtics 109–105. On February 22, he had a 44-point effort with 8 three-pointers in a 134–127 win over the Los Angeles Clippers. It was his third 40-point game of the season. On March 2, in a 114–109 win over the Atlanta Hawks, Curry made his 200th three-point field goal of the season, becoming the first player in NBA history with at least 200 three-pointers in six seasons, having reached the mark in every season since 2012–13. Four days later, in a 114–101 win over the Nets, Curry became the seventh player in Warriors history to make 5,000 career field goals, joining Chamberlain, Barry, Mullin, Arizin, Jeff Mullins, and Nate Thurmond.

On March 23, against the Hawks, Curry suffered a Grade 2 medial collateral ligament (MCL) sprain to his left knee. He subsequently missed nearly six weeks, returning to action in Game 2 of the Warriors' second-round playoff series against the Pelicans. He came off the bench to score 28 points in a 121–116 win. In Game 3 of the Western Conference Finals, Curry scored 35 points with 5 three-pointers in a 126–85 win over the Houston Rockets. The 41-point victory was the largest in franchise history during the postseason. In Game 6, Curry scored 29 points with 5 three-pointers, as the Warriors rallied from an early 17-point deficit to stave off elimination with a 115–86 victory over the Rockets. In Game 7, Curry recorded 27 points, 10 assists, and nine rebounds, as the Warriors earned a fourth straight trip to the NBA Finals by beating the Rockets 101–92.

In Game 2 of the NBA Finals, Curry hit a Finals-record 9 three-pointers and scored 33 points in a 122–103 win over the Cavaliers. In Game 4, Curry led all scorers with 37 points in a 108–85 win that helped the Warriors clinch their second straight championship with a series sweep over the Cavaliers. Many felt that he should have won Finals MVP. In response, Curry stated: "At the end of the day, I'm not going to let a [Finals] MVP trophy define my career. Three titles ... Wherever that puts us in the conversation in the history of the NBA ... I'm a three-time champ." Rohan Nadkarni of Sports Illustrated argued that "the Golden State dynasty started with Stephen Curry. He, for numerous reasons stretching from his incredible talent to his previous ankle injuries, put the Warriors in place to win their third championship in four seasons."

Fifth-straight NBA Finals (2018–2019)
On October 21, 2018, Curry had 30 points and 6 three-pointers in a 100–98 loss to the Denver Nuggets, thus moving past Paul Pierce for sixth place on the NBA's career three-point list. Three days later, he scored 51 points with 11 three-pointers in only three quarters in a 144–122 win over the Washington Wizards. He scored 31 in the first half and finished with his sixth career 50-point game and made 10 or more 3s for the 10th time. Curry's third three-pointer of the night moved him past Jamal Crawford (2,153) for fifth place on the NBA's career three-point list. On October 28, he made seven three-pointers and finished with 35 points in a 120–114 win over the Brooklyn Nets. Over the first seven games of the season, he made at least 5 three-pointers in all seven games, breaking George McCloud's record of six games in a row during the 1995–96 season. The Warriors started the season with a 10–1 record. On November 8 against the Milwaukee Bucks, Curry left the game during the third quarter with a groin injury and the Warriors were unable to recover in a 134–111 loss. Without Curry, the Warriors dropped to 12–7 on November 21 after enduring their first four-game losing streak since March 2013. The Warriors ended November with a 15–8 record, with Curry's strained left groin sidelining him for 11 straight games.

Despite Curry's 27 points in his return to the line-up on December 1, the Warriors were defeated 111–102 by the Detroit Pistons. On December 17, he scored 20 points in a 110–93 win over the Memphis Grizzlies, becoming just the fifth player in Warriors history to score 15,000 points during the regular season, joining Wilt Chamberlain (17,783), Rick Barry (16,447), Paul Arizin (16,266), and Chris Mullin (16,235). On December 23, he scored 42 points and made a layup with 0.5 seconds left to lift the Warriors to a 129–127 win over the Los Angeles Clippers. On January 5, he had 10 three-pointers and scored 20 of his 42 points in the fourth quarter of the Warriors' 127–123 win over the Sacramento Kings. On January 11, in a 146–109 win over the Chicago Bulls, Curry made 5 three-pointers to surpass Jason Terry (2,282) and move into third place all-time in NBA history behind Ray Allen (2,973) and Reggie Miller (2,560). Two days later, he scored 48 points and hit a season high-tying 11 three-pointers in a 119–114 win over the Dallas Mavericks. On January 16, he scored 41 points with 9 three-pointers to become the first player in NBA history to make eight or more 3s in three straight games, as the Warriors defeated the New Orleans Pelicans 147–140. On January 31, he scored 41 points with 10 three-pointers in a 113–104 loss to the Philadelphia 76ers. On February 21, he scored 36 points with 10 three-pointers in a 125–123 win over the Kings. On March 16 against the Oklahoma City Thunder, Curry reached 16,000 career points. On March 29, he made 11 three-pointers and scored 37 points in a 131–130 overtime loss to the Minnesota Timberwolves. On April 2, in a 116–102 win over the Nuggets, Curry made 5 or more three-pointers in a career-best nine straight games and moved past Mullin for fourth place on the Warriors all-time points list. On April 5, he scored 40 points in a 120–114 win over the Cleveland Cavaliers, thus moving past Arizin for third place on the Warriors all-time points list.

The Warriors entered the playoffs as the first seed in the Western Conference with a 57–25 record. In Game 1 of the Warriors' first-round playoff series against the Clippers, Curry scored 38 points and made 8 three-pointers to give him the most in postseason history, passing Ray Allen (385). He also had a postseason career-high 15 rebounds and seven assists in a 121–104 win. In Game 6 of the second round, Curry bounced back from the first scoreless first half of his playoff career to score 33 points in the last two quarters to help the Warriors eliminate the Houston Rockets with a 118–113 win and advance to the Western Conference Finals. In Game 1 of the Conference Finals, Curry matched his postseason career high with 9 three-pointers to finish with 36 points in a 116–94 win over the Portland Trail Blazers. Curry faced his brother Seth in that Finals series, making them the first set of brothers to face each other in an NBA playoff series. Steph averaged a series career-high 36.5 points to help the Warriors sweep the Trail Blazers. It was the highest average by a player in a four-game sweep in NBA history. Curry became the sixth player in NBA history to score 35 or more in the first four games of a series. In Game 4, he had 37 points, 12 rebounds, and 11 assists in a 119–117 overtime win, as he and Draymond Green became the first teammates in league history to have a triple-double in the same playoff game. In Game 3 of the 2019 Finals, Curry scored a playoff career-high 47 points to go with eight rebounds and seven assists in a 123–109 loss to the Toronto Raptors. In Game 5, he helped the Warriors stave off elimination with 31 points in a 106–105 win, cutting the Raptors' series lead to 3–2. In Game 6, Curry scored 21 points, but shot just 6 for 17 and went 3 of 11 on three-pointers, including missing a contested three-pointer in the waning moments, as the Warriors lost the game and the series with a 114–110 defeat.

Injury and comeback (2019–2021)
Curry was expected to take on a greater offensive load in the 2019–20 season with Thompson out injured and Kevin Durant having left the Warriors as a free agent. On October 30, 2019, against the Phoenix Suns in the fourth game of the season, Curry drove to the basket and collided with the Suns' Aron Baynes, who was trying to take a charge. Baynes fell on Curry's left hand, which required surgery to repair his broken second metacarpal. He was expected to be out at least three months. On March 5, 2020, Curry returned against the Raptors and recorded 23 points, six rebounds and seven assists in a 121–113 Warriors' loss.

On December 27, 2020, Curry put up 36 points in a 129–128 win over the Chicago Bulls. With this game, he joined Ray Allen and Reggie Miller as the only players to have scored more than 2,500 career three-pointers in NBA history. On January 3, 2021, Curry scored a career-high 62 points in a 137–122 win against the Portland Trail Blazers. On January 4, he was named the Player of the Week for the Western Conference. On January 23, in a game against the Utah Jazz, Curry hit 5 three-pointers, moving his career total up to 2,562, passing Miller to move up to second in the NBA's career three-pointers list, trailing only Allen. At the 2021 All-Star Game, he won his second Three-Point Contest after making his last shot in the final round to edge Mike Conley Jr. 28–27. On March 15, against the Los Angeles Lakers, Curry passed Guy Rodgers (4,855) as the franchise's leader in career assists.

On April 12, Curry scored 53 points in a 116–107 win against the Denver Nuggets, and he surpassed Chamberlain (17,783) to become the franchise's all-time scoring leader. It was part of an 11-game stretch in April in which Curry scored at least 30 points each game, surpassing Kobe Bryant's previous record for a player age 33 or older. Curry also had 78 three-pointers during that span, the most in NBA history over 11 regular season games. His play rekindled talk of him being a candidate for his third MVP award. He was named the Western Conference Player of the Month for April after averaging 37.3 points (the oldest player in NBA history to average more than 35 points per game in a single month) on 51.8% shooting and scoring 30 or more points in 13 of his 15 games. He became first NBA player to average 35 points and shoot 50–40–90 in a calendar month. His 96 three-pointers were an NBA record for a month, breaking James Harden's mark of 82 set in November 2019. Curry made 46.6% of his 3's in that span, including four games in which he made 10 or more three-pointers. He scored 46 points in the regular-season finale against Memphis to hold off Bradley Beal and secure his second scoring title as the oldest player in NBA history to average more than 30 points per game in a single season, finishing with a 32.0 point average.

Fourth NBA championship and first Finals MVP (2021–2022)

On October 19, 2021, in the Warriors' season-opener, Curry recorded his eighth career triple-double with 21 points, 10 rebounds, and 10 assists in a 121–114 win against the Los Angeles Lakers. On November 8, Curry scored 50 points, with 10 assists on nine three-pointers made, in a 127–113 win over the Atlanta Hawks. It was the first time in Curry's career that he posted 50 points and 10 assists in the same game, as he unseated Chamberlain as the oldest player in history to put up that single-game line. On November 12 against the Chicago Bulls, Curry became the NBA's career leader for three-pointers in both regular season and playoffs with 3,366, passing Ray Allen (3,358). On December 14 at Madison Square Garden against the New York Knicks, Curry made his 2,974th career three-pointer to pass Ray Allen and become the NBA all-time leader in made three-pointers. On January 21, 2022, Curry hit his first career buzzer-beating game-winner in a 105–103 win over the Houston Rockets, on a night where he put up 22 points and 12 assists. On January 31, Curry scored 40 points, 21 of which in the fourth quarter, behind seven three-pointers and dished out nine assists to lead Golden State to a 122–108 victory over the Houston Rockets. His 21 fourth-quarter points were the highest of his career.

In the 2022 NBA All-Star Game held on February 20, Curry's Team LeBron defeated Team Durant 163–160. Curry scored 50 points (just 2 points shy of the All-Star Game record set by Anthony Davis in 2017); he also set the record for most three-pointers made in an All-Star quarter (6), half (8), and game (16), and was named the All-Star Game MVP. On February 24, Curry had a season-high 14 assists with 18 points in a 132–95 blowout win over the Portland Trail Blazers. On March 10, Curry scored 34 points in a 113–102 win over the Denver Nuggets. He became the 49th player in NBA history to rack up 20,000 points. On March 14, his 34th birthday, Curry scored 47 points in a 126–112 win over the Washington Wizards. On March 16, in a 110–88 loss to the Boston Celtics, Curry suffered a sprained ligament in his left foot after having it rolled over by a diving Marcus Smart and was ruled out indefinitely. On April 1, he was ruled out for the remainder of the regular season.

On May 9, in Game 4 of the Western Conference semifinals against the Memphis Grizzlies, Curry became the first player in NBA history to make 500 career playoff threes. During the Western Conference Finals against the Dallas Mavericks, he averaged 23.8 points, 6.6 rebounds and 7.4 assists per game. After the Warriors won the series in five games, Curry was named the unanimous and inaugural winner of the Western Conference Finals MVP award. On June 10, in Game 4 of the NBA Finals, Curry logged 43 points, 10 rebounds, and four assists in a 107–97 victory over the Boston Celtics to even the series at 2–2. He became the first player in NBA history to make 5+ threes in four consecutive Finals games. Curry (at age 34 years, 88 days) also became the second-oldest player in NBA Finals history to record a 40-point, 10-rebound game behind only LeBron James in 2020 (at age 35 years, 284 days). In Game 5 of the Finals, Curry passed Boston Celtics legend John Havlicek for 10th on the all-time Finals assists list. In Game 6 of the Finals, Curry scored 34 points along with seven rebounds, seven assists, and led the Warriors to a 103–90 victory over the Celtics. He was named the NBA Finals MVP unanimously after averaging 31.2 points, 6.0 rebounds, 5.0 assists, and 2.0 steals per game.

Defending the title (2022–2023)
On November 7, 2022, Curry recorded 47 points, eight rebounds, eight assists, and zero turnovers as the Golden State Warriors beat the Sacramento Kings 116–113 to snap a five-game losing streak. On November 16, Curry scored 50 points alongside nine rebounds and six assists in a 130–119 loss to the Phoenix Suns. Curry also tied Michael Jordan for the second-most 50-point games after turning 30 years old, with six. On November 20, Curry posted a season-high 15 assists along with 33 points on 7-of-14 shooting from three-point range in a 127–120 win over the Houston Rockets. Curry, Klay Thompson, and Andrew Wiggins combined for 23 made three-pointers, the most three-pointers made in a game by a trio in NBA history. Curry (at age 34 years, 251 days) also became the second oldest player in NBA history to record at least 30 points and 15 assists in a game. On December 10, in a rematch of the 2022 NBA Finals, Curry recorded 32 points, six rebounds, and seven assists in a 123–107 win over the Boston Celtics. 

On January 25, 2023, against the Memphis Grizzlies, Curry was ejected with over a minute remaining for throwing a mouthpiece, but the Warriors managed to defeat the Grizzlies 122–120 behind Klay Thompson's clutch 3-pointer and Jordan Poole's game-winning layup. The next day, Curry was named a Western Conference starter for the 2023 NBA All-Star Game, marking his ninth overall selection. On January 30, Curry put up 38 points on 12-of-20 shooting from the field, alongside eight rebounds and 12 assists in a 128–120 win over the Oklahoma City Thunder. He also surpassed Wilt Chamberlain (7,216) for the most field goals made in Warriors history with 7,222. On March 15, Curry scored 50 points on 8-of-14 shooting from three-point range in a 134–126 loss to the Los Angeles Clippers. He became the first player in NBA history to score at least 10,000 career points off of three-pointers. Curry also surpassed Michael Jordan as having the most 50+ point games after turning 30 years old and is now tied with Wilt Chamberlain at 7 games.

National team career

Curry's first experience with the United States national team came at the 2007 FIBA Under-19 World Championship, where he helped Team USA capture the silver medal. In 2010, he was selected to the senior squad, playing limited minutes at the 2010 FIBA World Championship (known later as FIBA Basketball World Cup) as the United States won the gold medal in an undefeated tournament. In 2014, he took on a larger role with the team, helping them to another undefeated tournament at the 2014 World Cup and scoring 10 points in the final game. On June 6, 2016, Curry withdrew from consideration for the 2016 Olympics in Brazil, citing ankle and knee ailments as the major reason behind the decision.

Player profile
Listed at 6 feet 2 inches (1.88 m) and 190 pounds (86 kg), Curry plays almost exclusively at the point guard position and has career averages of 24.3 points, 6.5 assists, 4.6 rebounds, and 1.7 steals per game. His career free throw percentage of 90.8% (through the end of the 2021–22 season) is the highest in NBA history. Curry is the Warriors' all-time free-throw leader, and has led the NBA in free throw percentage four times. He has been selected to eight All-NBA Teams and voted league MVP twice. A leader within the Warriors organization, he helped recruit former MVP Kevin Durant to the Warriors.

Curry led the league in steals in the 2015–16 season, but has been criticized for his defense. He is used more for his offense while his teammates, Klay Thompson and Draymond Green, take on more defensive assignments. Some analysts, including Ethan Sherwood Strauss of ESPN, have complimented his defensive play or called it underrated. Strauss said in 2015 that Curry became "one of the NBA's most effective defenders – ranking fifth among point guards in defensive real plus-minus."

Curry scores a lot from underneath the rim all the way to near half-court. Using an unorthodox jump shot, he releases the ball from his hands in under half a second by releasing it on the way up, adding extra arc to his shot and making it difficult to block. The shooting proficiency earned him the nickname "Baby-Faced Assassin" during his pre-NBA years, and "Chef Curry" while in the NBA. He is also known for his ball handling and playmaking, and for putting pressure on defenses with his long range, leading the NBA in field goals made from beyond 28 feet in 2016. A clutch scorer, he often shoots at his best in high-pressure moments, and takes game-winning shots.

Curry ranks 12th in NBA history in career three-point field goal percentage and holds four of the top five seasons in terms of total three-pointers made. He is also the fastest player in league history to make 2,000 career three-pointers, doing so in 227 fewer games than the previous record-holder, Ray Allen. Additionally, Curry is the fastest player to make 100 three-pointers in a season, doing so in just 19 games, breaking his own previous record of 20 games.

NBA analysts say that Curry's scoring creates a "gravity" effect, forcing opposing defenders to double-team him even when he does not have the ball, which creates mismatches that his teammates exploit. With Curry, the Warriors average 10.8 isolations per game; without Curry, they average 15.3 isolations per game. His absence slows the Warriors offense and leads to less passing and ball movement. With Curry, the Warriors average 1.05 points every shot that comes after an off-ball screen; without Curry, it drops to 0.95 points per game. His absence makes it much easier for defenders to switch on screens. Of Curry's success with or without other elite teammates, Tom Haberstroh of NBC Sports said, "You can pluck All-Star after All-Star off the court like flower petals, and the Steph-led Warriors will still dominate like a champion. He's that transcendent of a player."

Legacy

Curry is widely considered to be the greatest shooter in NBA history. He is credited with revolutionizing the game of basketball by inspiring teams, from high school to the NBA, to regularly use the three-point shot. Analysts have referred to him as "the Michael Jordan of the three-point era", saying that he did for the three-point shot what Jordan did for the slam dunk. The Guardians Robert O'Connell cites Curry's February 27, 2013, game against the New York Knicks, in which he made 11 of 13 shots from behind the arc en route for a 54-point performance, as the start of the three-point era. The era has been referred to as "The Steph Effect" or "the NBA's Three-Point Revolution".

Before Curry, shooting behind the three-point line was more of a novelty, an occasional way of scoring. Catch and shoot players existed, but Curry's success inspired the league to abandon physical play around the basket and to embrace a pace and space and three-point shooting style. The increase in three-point shooting is partly due to NBA teams incorporating it in their attempts to defeat the Warriors or copy the Warriors' style of play, and to young people wanting to imitate Curry's shooting range. Although this has led to players becoming good at or improving their three-point shot, it has also set unrealistic standards because Curry's range is unique. Curry regularly takes shots from between 30 and 35 feet. He shoots 54 percent from this range, while the NBA makes 35 percent of its threes overall and under 22 percent from between 30 and 35 feet. He can make the shots with elite ball handling, off the dribble, and often with an extremely quick release, from anywhere on the court and with one or more defenders on him. Curry said that he is sure coaches tell their high school players that shooting the way he does takes work and time. Jesse Dougherty of The Washington Post stated that "coaches have to explain that while Curry's skill set is something to aspire to, his game is built on fundamentals" and that "while the Warriors have become the NBA's gold standard and make all those social-media-bound plays, the root of their success is ball movement."

Kirk Goldsberry of ESPN opined that "one of the keys to [Curry's] greatness is his range" and that "Curry isn't just the best 3-point shooter ever, he's the best deep 3-point shooter ever." Sally Jenkins of The Washington Post stated that he "moves around behind the three-point line in an ever-widening arc, sinking long distance shots so cleanly that the net seems to snap like fresh laundry in a breeze" and that a highlight is the "sheer preposterousness of his shots, and the rate at which he is sinking the most far-fetched of them." She said that "in one stretch he hit a mind-expanding 67 percent between 28 and 50 feet." Warriors Coach Steve Kerr stated that Curry's hand-eye coordination "is as great as anyone I've ever seen." Jeff Austin of Octagon concluded that Curry "had to develop tremendous strength in his wrists to shoot and maintain that form from 40 and 50 feet." Goldsberry stated that "no player in the history of the NBA has combined range, volume and efficiency from downtown as well as Curry" and that "Curry's jumper is so lethal that he has become the most efficient volume scorer on the planet." His range and efficiency drove the developers of the NBA 2K video game series, in which Curry is featured, to worry that his abilities could not be replicated on screen.

Where Curry ranks as one of the greatest NBA players has been more subject to debate. Former NBA player Steve Nash, who is also among the NBA's all-time efficient shooters, said Curry is "already an all-time great" and that people question his greatness "because he doesn't dominate the game physically. He dances. He pays a tax for that. He pays a tax for his great teammates." Scottie Pippen, who won six NBA titles with the Chicago Bulls, said that Curry's "willingness to sacrifice" for Kevin Durant is "one of the great stories in history" because Curry welcomed Durant, who is also a top player, to the Warriors without ego. Crediting Curry with being "one of the greatest guards the game has ever seen", he said: "If you have a mind for the game, you know that it takes sacrifice to be great. All the greats have to sacrifice something. Otherwise you can't win." CBS Sports ranked Curry at No. 19 in their list of "50 greatest NBA players of all time". Sports Illustrated ranked him at No. 3, behind Durant and LeBron James, on their "Top 100 NBA Players of 2019" list. Sports Illustrated stated that "Curry and the Warriors are a great match of player and system" and that "the entire ecosystem is predicated on the idea that a player doesn't need to dominate the ball to dominate a game. Curry took that noble idea and elevated it beyond any reasonable expectation."

In 2020, an ESPN feature ranked Curry as the 13th-greatest basketball player of all time, the second-highest active player on the list. Nick Friedell of ESPN said "The greatest shooter of all time. Curry's ability to hit shots from all over the floor changed the way the game is played. He has led the Warriors to three NBA championships and earned two MVP awards, becoming the first unanimous MVP in league history in 2015–16. Curry's influence on the game is seen on every level of basketball as younger generations shoot more than ever while trying to replicate his game." In a similar list in 2022, The Athletic ranked Curry as the 15th greatest player in NBA history. Marcus Thompson II said "In 20 years, Curry will be talked about with excitement reserved for the most legendary. Like the elders of today talk about Abdul-Jabbar and Bill Russell, and how their children revere Larry Bird and Charles Barkley." In October 2021, Curry was honored as one of the league's greatest players of all time by being named to the NBA 75th Anniversary Team.

Awards and honors

NBA
 NBA Finals MVP: 2022
 2× NBA Most Valuable Player: , 
 The only unanimous MVP selection in league history (2016)
 NBA All-Star Game MVP: 
 NBA Western Conference Finals MVP: 2022
 NBA 75th Anniversary Team: 
 8× All-NBA selection:
 Third team: 
 All-Rookie First Team: 
 2× NBA scoring leader: , 
 NBA steals leader: 
 2× NBA Three-Point Contest champion: , 
 NBA Skills Challenge champion: 
 NBA Sportsmanship Award: 
 NBA Community Assist Award: 
 NBA record for most three-point field goals made in history (3,339)
 NBA record for highest career free throw percentage (90.9%, minimum 1,200 attempts)
 NBA regular season record for made three-pointers (402)
 NBA record for most career three-point field goals made in playoffs (561)
 NBA record for most three-point field goals made in a single playoffs (98 – tied with Klay Thompson)
 NBA Finals record for most three-point field goals made (152)
 NBA Finals record for most three-point field goals made in a game (9)
 NBA record for most consecutive regular season games with a made three-pointer (157)
 NBA record for most consecutive playoff games with a made three-pointer (90)
 NBA regular season record for most games with 10+ made three-pointers (23)
 NBA record for most points scored in an overtime period (17)
 Warriors franchise leader in points
 Warriors franchise leader in assists
 Warriors franchise leader in steals
 Warriors franchise leader in made field goals
 Warriors franchise leader in made three-point field goals
 Warriors franchise leader in free throw percentage
 Warriors franchise leader in points in playoffs
 Warriors franchise leader in assists in playoffs
 Warriors franchise leader in steals in playoffs
 Warriors franchise leader in three-point field goals made in playoffs
 Warriors franchise record holder for triple-double as a rookie
 Led the Warriors to achieve the highest all-time regular season winning record in NBA history (73–9 – 89%)

College
 2× SoCon Player of the Year (2008–2009)
 Consensus first-team All-American (2009)
 Consensus second-team All-American (2008)
 3× First-team All-SoCon (2007–2009)
 2× SoCon Tournament Most Outstanding Player (2007, 2008)
 3× SoCon first-team All-Tournament (2007–2009)
 SoCon Freshman of the Year (2007)
 SoCon All-Freshmen Team (2007)

NCAA records
 NCAA Division I scoring leader (2009)
 Single-season NCAA 3-point field goals (162, 2007–08)
 Single-season NCAA freshman 3-point field goals (122, 2006–07)

Davidson College records
 All-time leading scorer in history (2,635)
 All-time leader in 3-point field-goals made (414)
 All-time leader in 30-point games (30)
 All-time leader in 40-point games (6)
 Single-season points (974, 2008–09)
 Single-season steals (86, 2008–09)
 Single-season freshman points (730, 2006–07)

Other
 Laureus World Sportsman of the Year nominee (3): 2016–2017, 2023
 ESPY Award for Best Male Athlete: 2015
 ESPY Award for Best NBA Player (3): 2015, 2021–2022
 ESPY Award for Best Record-Breaking Performance (2): 2016, 2022
 ESPY Award for Best Breakthrough Athlete nominee: 2008
 BET Award for Sportsman of the Year (5): 2015–2017, 2019, 2022
 Jackie Robinson Sports Award: 2021
 Hickok Belt: 2015
 AP Male Athlete of the Year: 2015
 Sports Illustrated Sportsperson of the Year (2): 2018 (as a team), 2022
 Jefferson Award for Public Service: 2011
 Key to the City of Charlotte: 2022
 Academy Award for Best Documentary Short Film (as executive producer of The Queen of Basketball): 2022

Career statistics

NBA

Regular season

|-
| style="text-align:left;"|
| style="text-align:left;"|Golden State
| 80 || 77 || 36.2 || .462 || .437 || .885 || 4.5 || 5.9 || 1.9 || .2 || 17.5
|-
| style="text-align:left;"|
| style="text-align:left;"|Golden State
| 74 || 74 || 33.6 || .480 || .442 || style="background:#cfecec;"|.934* || 3.9 || 5.8 || 1.5 || .3 || 18.6
|-
| style="text-align:left;"|
| style="text-align:left;"|Golden State
| 26 || 23 || 28.2 || .490 || .455 || .809 || 3.4 || 5.3 || 1.5 || .3 || 14.7
|-
| style="text-align:left;"|
| style="text-align:left;"|Golden State
| 78 || 78 || 38.2 || .451 || .453 || .900 || 4.0 || 6.9 || 1.6 || .2 || 22.9
|-
| style="text-align:left;"|
| style="text-align:left;"|Golden State
| 78 || 78 || 36.5 || .471 || .424 || .885 || 4.3 || 8.5 || 1.6 || .2 || 24.0
|-
| style="text-align:left; background:#afe6ba;"|†
| style="text-align:left;"|Golden State
| 80 || 80 || 32.7 || .487 || .443 || style="background:#cfecec;"|.914* || 4.3 || 7.7 || 2.0 || .2 || 23.8
|-
| style="text-align:left;"|
| style="text-align:left;"|Golden State
| 79 || 79 || 34.2 || .504 || .454 || style="background:#cfecec;"|.908* || 5.4 || 6.7 || style="background:#cfecec;"|2.1* || .2 || style="background:#cfecec;"|30.1*
|-
| style="text-align:left; background:#afe6ba;"|†
| style="text-align:left;"|Golden State
| 79 || 79 || 33.4 || .468 || .411 || .898 || 4.5 || 6.6 || 1.8 || .2 || 25.3
|-
| style="text-align:left; background:#afe6ba;"|†
| style="text-align:left;"| Golden State
| 51 || 51 || 32.0 || .495 || .423 || style="background:#cfecec;"|.921* || 5.1 || 6.1 || 1.6 || .2 || 26.4
|-
| style="text-align:left;"|
| style="text-align:left;"|Golden State
| 69 || 69 || 33.8 || .472 || .437 || .916 || 5.3 || 5.2 || 1.3 || .4 || 27.3
|-
| style="text-align:left;"|
| style="text-align:left;"|Golden State
| 5 || 5 || 27.8 || .402 || .245 || 1.000 || 5.2 || 6.6 || 1.0 || .4 || 20.8
|-
| style="text-align:left;"|
| style="text-align:left;"|Golden State
| 63 || 63 || 34.2 || .482 || .421 || .916 || 5.5 || 5.8 || 1.2 || .1 || style="background:#cfecec;"| 32.0*
|-
| style="text-align:left; background:#afe6ba;"|†
| style="text-align:left;"|Golden State
| 64 || 64 || 34.5 || .437 || .380 || .923 || 5.2 || 6.3 || 1.3 || .4 || 25.5
|- class="sortbottom"
| style="text-align:center;" colspan="2"|Career
| 826 || 820 || 34.3 || .473 || .428 || style="background:#e0cef2;"|.908 || 4.6 || 6.5 || 1.7 || .2 || 24.3
|- class="sortbottom"
| style="text-align:center;" colspan="2"|All-Star
| 8 || 8 || 27.0 || .433 || .405 || 1.000 || 5.6 || 5.8 || 1.4 || .3 || 22.5

Playoffs

|-
| style="text-align:left;"|2013
| style="text-align:left;"|Golden State
| 12 || 12 || 41.4 || .434 || .396 || .921 || 3.8 || 8.1 || 1.7 || .2 || 23.4
|-
| style="text-align:left;"|2014
| style="text-align:left;"|Golden State
| 7 || 7 || 42.3 || .440 || .386 || .881 || 3.6 || 8.4 || 1.7 || .1 || 23.0
|-
| style="text-align:left; background:#afe6ba;"|2015†
| style="text-align:left;"|Golden State
| 21 || 21 || 39.3 || .456 || .422 || .835 || 5.0 || 6.4 || 1.9 || .1 || 28.3|-
| style="text-align:left;"|2016
| style="text-align:left;"|Golden State
| 18 || 17 || 34.3 || .438 || .404 || .916 || 5.5 || 5.2 || 1.4 || .3 || 25.1
|-
| style="text-align:left; background:#afe6ba;"|2017†
| style="text-align:left;"|Golden State
| 17 || 17 || 35.3 || .484 || .419 || .904 || 6.2 || 6.7 || 2.0 || .2 || 28.1
|-
| style="text-align:left; background:#afe6ba;"|2018†
| style="text-align:left;"|Golden State
| 15 || 14 || 37.0 || .451 || .395 || .957 || 6.1 || 5.4 || 1.7 || .7 || 25.5
|-
| style="text-align:left;"|2019
| style="text-align:left;"|Golden State
| 22 || 22 || 38.5 || .441 || .377 || .943 || 6.0 || 5.7 || 1.1 || .2 || 28.2
|-
| style="text-align:left; background:#afe6ba;"|2022†
| style="text-align:left;"|Golden State
| 22 || 18 || 34.7 || .459 || .397 || .829 || 5.2 || 5.9 || 1.3 || .4 || 27.4
|- class="sortbottom"
| style="text-align:center;" colspan="2"|Career
| 134 || 128 || 37.3 || .452 || .401 || .892 || 5.4 || 6.2 || 1.6 || .3 || 26.6

College

|-
| style="text-align:left;"|2006–07
| style="text-align:left;"|Davidson
| 34 || 33 || 30.9 || .463 || .408 || .855 || 4.6 || 2.8 || 1.8 || .2 || 21.5
|-
| style="text-align:left;"|2007–08
| style="text-align:left;"|Davidson
| 36 || 36 || 33.1 || .483 || .439 || .894 || 4.6 || 2.9 || 2.0 || .4 || 25.9
|-
| style="text-align:left;"|2008–09
| style="text-align:left;"|Davidson
| 34 || 34 || 33.7 || .454 || .387 || .876 || 4.4 || 5.6 || 2.5 || .2 || style="background:#cfecec;"|28.6'*
|- class="sortbottom"
| style="text-align:center;" colspan="2" |Career
| 104 || 103 || 32.6 || .467 || .412 || .876 || 4.5 || 3.7 || 2.1 || .3 || 25.3

Off the court

Personal life

On July 30, 2011, Curry married longtime girlfriend and Toronto-area native Ayesha Alexander in Charlotte. Together, they have two daughters who were born in 2012 and 2015, and a son who was born in 2018. In July 2019, Curry paid $31 million for a home in Atherton, California. Curry's younger brother, Seth, is also a professional basketball player, and his younger sister, Sydel, played volleyball at Elon University.

Curry has been outspoken about his Christian faith. He spoke about his faith during his MVP speech by saying: "People should know who I represent and why I am who I am, and that's because of my Lord and Savior." He also said the reason that he pounds his chest and points up is that he has a "heart for God" and as a reminder that he plays for God. On some of his "Curry One" basketball shoes, there is a lace loop scripted "4:13". It is a reference to the Bible verse Philippians 4:13, which reads: "I can do all things through Christ who strengthens me." Curry has a tattoo of First Corinthians 13:8 in Hebrew on his wrist ("Love never fails..."). Curry is also an investor in Active Faith, a Christian sports apparel brand.

During the 1992 NBA All-Star Game weekend, Curry's father entrusted him to Biserka Petrović, mother of future Hall of Fame player Dražen Petrović, while Dell competed in the Three-Point Contest. Following the 2015 NBA Finals, Curry gave Biserka one of his Finals-worn jerseys, which will reportedly be added to the collection of the Dražen Petrović Memorial Center, a museum to the late player in the Croatian capital of Zagreb.

Curry suffers from keratoconus and wears contact lenses to correct his vision. Curry is also an avid golfer; he started playing golf at the age of 10, played golf in high school, and frequently plays golf with teammate Andre Iguodala. A 5-handicap golfer, Curry participates in celebrity golf tournaments and has played golf alongside Barack Obama. In August 2017, Curry competed in the Ellie Mae Classic on an unrestricted sponsor exemption. Although he missed the first cut, he scored 4-over-74 for both days he participated, surpassing most expectations for an amateur competing in the pro event. In August 2019, Curry and Howard University, a historically black institution in Washington, D.C., jointly announced that the school would add NCAA Division I teams in men's and women's golf starting in the 2020–21 school year, with Curry guaranteeing full funding of both teams for six years. Curry is also a fan of English soccer club Chelsea F.C.

Public image

Curry is one of the most successful players in the NBA, and has also become an international celebrity, on par with four-time MVP LeBron James. Like James, he has been considered the face of the NBA, but has said that he is not motivated by that and is not looking "to take LeBron's throne or whatever. You know, I'm trying to chase rings, and that's all I'm about. So that's where the conversation stops for me." His flashy play and penchant for coming up big in the clutch have made him a fan favorite, and his smaller physique is said to have made his success seem more attainable for younger fans of the NBA. Curry's jersey was the top seller in the NBA for the 2015–16 and 2016–17 NBA seasons.

ESPN has ranked Curry among the most famous international athletes, while Forbes has ranked him among the world's highest-paid celebrities for his endorsements. ESPN's Kirk Goldsberry reasoned that one reason for Curry's popularity is that while most people are not tall enough to dunk, everyone can attempt a shot, which is something Curry inspires. Owen Davis of Sky Sports echoed this sentiment, stating: "After all, not everyone is blessed with supreme height and athleticism, but everyone can learn to pass, dribble and shoot. Curry is proof that if you work hard enough, you can still find ways to dominate, no matter your size."

Monte Poole of NBC Sports found Curry to be "the most human of superstars," with a childlike aura to him when he plays with success. His fanbase ranges from very young children to the elderly, and casual or committed fans enjoy his style of play. Poole stated that "the joy factor exponentially increases" when Curry is on the court and that "the sight of this relatively ordinary specimen sending much bigger players into silent surrender is an intoxicant for the Warriors and their fans."

Business interests

Curry is widely known for his partnership with Under Armour, where he is considered to be the "face of their footwear line". Originally signed to Nike, Curry partnered with Under Armour in the 2013 offseason. As Curry became MVP and one of the most popular athletes in the world, sales of his shoes have become a major factor for the brand, with stock prices rising and falling based on the success of the Curry shoe line.

In September 2017, it was announced that Curry had signed an exclusive autograph contract with Steiner Sports Memorabilia. The full product line will include hand-signed official basketballs and jerseys, autographed photographs of epic moments, flashy framed signs and wall-art, game-used memorabilia, and limited-edition pieces.

In October 2018, Curry announced his involvement with the relaunch of Palm, a mobile companion device that pairs with a primary smartphone. Curry is an investor and the leading brand ambassador for Palm, a small startup based in San Francisco which licenses the Palm name from TCL Corporation. He is also involved with designing and testing accessories and even helped to name the device.

In October 2019, Curry invested in SnapTravel (now SuperTravel), a technology company that focuses on travel and ticket search.

In 2021, Curry, among other high-profile athletes and celebrities, was a paid spokesperson for FTX, a cryptocurrency exchange. In November 2022, FTX filed for bankruptcy, wiping out billions of dollars in customer funds. Curry, alongside other spokespeople, is currently being sued for promoting unregistered securities through a class-action lawsuit. In February 2022, the U.S. 11th Circuit Court of Appeals ruled in a lawsuit against Bitconnect that the Securities Act of 1933 extends to targeted solicitation using social media.

Charity
In 2012, Curry started donating three insecticide-treated mosquito nets for every three-pointer he made to the United Nations Foundation's Nothing But Nets campaign to combat malaria. He was first introduced to the malaria cause by Davidson teammate Bryant Barr when they were both in school. Curry visited the White House in 2015 and delivered a five-minute speech to dignitaries as part of President Barack Obama's launch of his President's Malaria Initiative strategy for 2015–2020.

In 2015, Curry wore sneakers that had Deah Shaddy Barakat's name on them; he was one of the victims of the 2015 Chapel Hill shooting. According to his sister Suzanne, Deah Barakat was known for his "love for basketball and anything Steph Curry." Deah's number for his intramural basketball team at North Carolina State University was Curry's No. 30, and he posed for a photo that was similar to one that Curry did for GQ. Curry said that Barakat's family "did a great job of reaching out to me and making me aware of the details of his life and personality. ... It was really kind of a cool deal to be able to use the platform yesterday to honor Deah and his family. ... I'm going to send them the shoes I wore yesterday. And hopefully, they know that I've been thinking about them." Also in 2015, after winning the MVP award following his impressive season, Curry donated his prize vehicle—a 2016 Kia Sorento—to the East Oakland Youth Development Center, a local non-profit organization located in the backyard of Oracle Arena.

In December 2018, while on a podcast, Curry questioned whether the Apollo program's Moon landing actually happened, which received substantial media attention and criticism. NASA offered Curry a tour of the Johnson Space Center and to discuss the matter with him. Curry later said that he was joking about the Moon landing not having happened. He had Under Armour create some shoes inspired by the comment and subsequent discussion. After wearing them to a game, he signed and auctioned them off. The shoes sold for $58,100 on eBay after 113 bids, and the money was donated for STEM education initiatives.

In July 2019, Curry and his wife launched the Eat. Learn. Play. Foundation in Oakland, California. The foundation works to end childhood hunger, increase access to quality education, and provide safe spaces for children to stay active.

Production company
In April 2018, Sony Pictures Entertainment announced a wide-ranging, multiyear multimedia deal with Curry's newly formed production company Unanimous Media (named for Curry becoming the first NBA player in history to be elected the league's MVP by a unanimous vote), located on the Sony Pictures studio lot in Culver City. The film and TV deal included electronics, gaming and virtual reality and will focus on faith and family-friendly content. In October 2018, Curry signed on as executive producer of the film Breakthrough, scheduled for release in April 2019. Curry was also executive producer of the film Emanuel, scheduled for US theatrical release in select theaters on June 17, 2019. The film focuses on the responses of family members of victims of the 2015 Charleston church shooting. Curry said: "In the face of adversity, in the face of tragedy, how can I get through it?"

Beginning in 2019, Curry is both an executive producer and resident golf pro on the American sports reality competition television series Holey Moley. On June 24, 2020, Curry released a trailer for his new show on his YouTube channel, which is called Ultimate Home Championships, a show featuring people such as DeAndre Jordan, Ronda Rousey, and Kristopher London where contestants compete in wacky at-home challenges using things in their home. In 2020, the company signed a deal with Amazon's Audible. Curry is the executive producer of an animated revival of the 1970s sitcom Good Times with its original executive producer, Norman Lear, and Family Guy'' creator Seth MacFarlane. The animated series was greenlit by Netflix in 2020. In 2021, he signed a deal with NBCUniversal.

Politics 
Curry and his wife endorsed Joe Biden for President of the United States during the Democratic National Convention (DNC) in August 2020.

In December 2021, Curry voiced his support for the For the People Act, an election reform bill aimed at expanding voting rights.

In 2023, Curry opposed the development of multi-family housing in the wealthy enclave of Atherton, California where he and his family live. In a letter in which Curry and his wife opposed affordable housing in his own neighborhood, they wrote, "We hesitate to add to the 'not in our backyard' (literally) rhetoric, but... safety and privacy for us and our kids continues to be our top priority and one of the biggest reasons we chose Atherton as home."

See also

 List of National Basketball Association annual free throw percentage leaders
 List of National Basketball Association annual three-point field goals leaders
 List of National Basketball Association career scoring leaders
 List of National Basketball Association career assists leaders
 List of National Basketball Association career 3-point scoring leaders
 List of National Basketball Association career turnovers leaders
 List of National Basketball Association career playoff scoring leaders
 List of National Basketball Association career playoff assists leaders
 List of National Basketball Association career playoff 3-point scoring leaders
 List of National Basketball Association franchise career scoring leaders
 List of National Basketball Association single-game scoring leaders
 List of NBA players who have spent their entire career with one franchise
 List of NCAA Division I men's basketball season scoring leaders
 List of second-generation National Basketball Association players
 NBA regular season records

Notes

References
General

Specific

External links

 Davidson Wildcats bio

1988 births
Living people
2010 FIBA World Championship players
2014 FIBA Basketball World Cup players
21st-century Christians
African-American basketball players
African-American Christians
All-American college men's basketball players
American men's basketball players
American philanthropists
Basketball players from Akron, Ohio
Basketball players from Charlotte, North Carolina
Charlotte Christian School alumni
Curry family
Davidson Wildcats men's basketball players
FIBA Basketball World Cup-winning players
FIBA World Championship-winning players
Golden State Warriors draft picks
Golden State Warriors players
National Basketball Association All-Stars
People from Alamo, California
People from Atherton, California
Point guards
Shorty Award winners
Sportspeople from the San Francisco Bay Area
United States men's national basketball team players